John Bragg is an American rock climber and alpinist, noted for first ascents of difficult rock climbs in the Shawangunks and Colorado, and taking high-grade rock skills to Patagonia, to make the first ascent of Torre Egger in 1976 with Jim Donini and Jay Wilson.

Notable climbs
1973 Kansas City, 5.12, Shawangunks, NY, USA - FFA, one of the first 5.12s in the Gunks.
1976 Torre Egger - First Ascent - with Jim Donini, and Jay Wilson from the United States, by climbing first to the col between the Egger and Cerro Torre, the Col of Conquest, and then up the ridge to the peak.  The ascent was hampered by bad weather and took from December 1975 to February 22, 1976 when the 3-person team summitted.
2000 Lightning Spur, south face Thunder Mountain, Alaska Range, Alaska USA. FA with Jim Donini (USA).

Publications
1977

See also
History of rock climbing
List of first ascents (sport climbing)
Henry Barber (rock climber), climbing partner of John Bragg

References

American mountain climbers
American rock climbers
Living people
Year of birth missing (living people)